Sabra may refer to:

Arts and entertainment
 Sabra (comics), a fictional Israeli female superhero in the Marvel Comics universe
 Sabra (magazine), a Japanese magazine for men
 Sabra Command the original title of the film Warhead
 "Sabra Girl", a song on Nickel Creek's album This Side

Businesses
 Sabra (company), a company specializing in hummus and Mediterranean-style dips
 Gamda Koor Sabra, or simply Sabra, an Israeli toy company
 Sabra liqueur, a collection of Israeli liqueurs made by the Carmel Winery

Places
 Sabra, Algeria, a town and commune in Tlemcen Province
 Sabra, Burkina Faso
 Säbrå, part of Härnösand Municipality, Sweden
 Sabra, Gaza, a neighborhood in Gaza in the Palestinian territories
 Sabra District, a district of Tlemcen Province in north-western Algeria
 Sabra, a neighborhood adjacent to the Shatila refugee camp

Other uses
 Sabra (moth), a moth genus
 Sabra (name), a given name and surname — and a list of people bearing the name
 Sabra (person), a Jew born in Israel
 Sabra (tank), an Israeli Military Industries-upgraded M60 Patton tank
 Sabra Sport, an Israeli sports car manufactured in the 1960s
 Another name for the prickly pear Opuntia
 South African Bureau for Racial Affairs (SABRA)

See also
 Sabre (disambiguation)